The Norwegian Oil and Gas Association is a professional body and employer’s association for oil and supplier companies.

More than 100 companies associated with oil and gas activities on the Norwegian continental shelf belong to the Norwegian Oil and Gas Association. Their main office is  located at Forus, Stavanger. They also have offices in Oslo and Harstad.

External links
Official site

Employers' organisations in Norway
North Sea energy
1981 establishments in Norway
Organizations established in 1981
Organisations based in Sandnes
Petroleum organizations